Rosellinia subiculata is a fungal plant pathogen infecting citruses.

References

External links 
 Index Fungorum
 USDA ARS Fungal Database

Fungal citrus diseases
Xylariales
Fungi described in 1882